Hymen o Hymenee is an 1889 painting by Filipino painter and revolutionary activist Juan Luna.  The painting won a bronze medal during the 1889 Paris Exposition Universelle in Paris, France.

References

Paintings by Juan Luna
1889 paintings